Londinium is the debut album by London-based trip hop band Archive. The title is taken from the Roman name for London.  Roya Arab is the principal vocalist throughout the album, and Rosko John provides rapping.
"Skyscraper" uses a sample from "Mmm Skyscraper... I Love You" by Underworld. In addition, Karl Hyde, from Underworld, plays bass on the track "Headspace". "Londinium" was remixed by Kevin Shields and released as a 12″.

Track listing
"Old Artist" – 4:04
"All Time" – 3:51
"So Few Words" – 6:12
"Headspace" * – 4:13
"Darkroom" – 4:31
"Londinium" – 5:19
"Man Made" – 4:37
"Nothing Else" – 4:37
"Skyscraper" – 4:24
"Parvaneh (Butterfly)" – 3:50
"Beautiful World" – 6:36
"Organ Song" – 2:23
"Last Five" – 5:49
 * Ubiquitous Wife Remix

The album contains a hidden track, which begins about 39 seconds after the end of "Last Five"; it runs 1:24, while the actual song "Last Five" runs 3:47.

Personnel
Artwork By [Cd Design & Tray] - Mat Cook Intro
Initial creative agent - Ady Lloyd
Bass - Karl Hyde (track 4)
Cello - Julia Palmer
Drums [Additional Drums] - Matheu Martin (tracks: 3)
Engineer - Pete Barraclough
Flute - Pete Barraclough (tracks: 2, 4, 13)
French Horn - Jane Hanna (tracks: 12)
Guitar - Karl Hyde (tracks 4, 5, 6, 13), Pete Barraclough (track 12), Steve Taylor (track 11)
Mixed By - Neil McLellan
Mixed By [Assistant] - Pat McGovern
Photography - Andy Earl
Producer, Mixed By - Archive
Triangle [Guest Trianglist] - Anita Hill
Violin - Ali Keeler (tracks 1, 6, 7, 12)
Vocals - Roya Arab
Vocals [Additional] - Jane Wall (tracks: 11), Siobhan Sian (track 11)
Vocals [Rap] - Rosko John
Written-By - D. Keeler (music: all tracks), D. Griffiths (music: tracks 3, 5, 7, 9, 10, 13), A. Keeler (music: tracks 1, 12), R. John (lyrics: tracks 3, 5, 6, 9, 11, 13), R. Arab (lyrics: tracks 2 to 6, 8, 10, 13)

Track 9 contains a sample from Underworld's "Mmm Skyscraper I Love You".

References

1996 debut albums
Archive (band) albums
Island Records albums